Gyrinus parcus is a species of whirligig beetle in the family Gyrinidae. It is found in Central America, North America, and South America.

Subspecies
These six subspecies belong to the species Gyrinus parcus:
 Gyrinus parcus agnatus Ochs, 1949
 Gyrinus parcus californicus Ochs, 1949
 Gyrinus parcus cognatus Ochs, 1949
 Gyrinus parcus elatus Ochs, 1949
 Gyrinus parcus fa
 Gyrinus parcus parcus Say, 1834

References

Further reading

 
 

Gyrinidae
Articles created by Qbugbot
Beetles described in 1834